Krishnaut or Krishnaut Ahir or Krishnaut Yaduvanshi is a clan of the  Hindu Yadav (Ahir) caste found in Uttar Pradesh, Bihar, Jharkhand, Delhi and other parts of the Indian state . The term Krishnaut denotes their descent from Lord Krishna.
 
Majority of Yadavs were peasants with landholdings in the Northern and Central parts of India, a small segment of the community had taken over land in the newly reclaimed portion of Eastern Bihar (Purnea and Saharsa) to become big landowners.

Origin and History
The Krishnaut subcaste of Yadav's a name which to them denotes descent from Lord Krishna. Krishnaut Yadav's Are Group Of Seven Muls Of Ancient Yaduvanshi Clans That Are Said To Sri Krishna Descendants. The First Four Clan Claims Their Migration From Mathura And Braj Belt Area And The Other Three Clans Are Said To Be Last Descent Of Gopala Dynasty of Yaduvanshi Kshatriyas Of Nepal.

List of Kingdom and Estate
In Bihar Nepal and Jharkhand there were many rulers and zamindars belonging to Ahir (Yadav) caste. The Ahir zamindars were predominantly found in northern and eastern parts of Bihar. Most of them belonged to Krishnaut and Majhraut clans of Ahir.
 Gopala Abhira Rulers Of Nepal
Kishnaut Ahir Jagirdars Or Zamindars of Parasadi Estate and Parsauna (Saran) Ruled 16th century To Independence 
Ahir chief of Ruidas-Patna.
Ahir Rajas of Gawror Fort, Patna.
Gosaipur Darbar
Rahimapur Estate Of Hajipur.
Dudhiya Darbar, Darbhanga
Kanheli Estate, Araria

Khorasen Jagir Of Saharsa.

Culture
Krishnaut people worship Bir Kuar, Bakhtaur Baba as their deity. They sing Lorikayan in Bihar. Krishnaut Yadavas never sell milk, ghee, or butter and to a large extent, they became cultivators.

Distribution and Titles

Distribution
Krishnaut numerically exceed other sub-caste in the diara land of Patna, Saran and Vaishali district of Bihar.

Title
The titles generally used by Krishnaut and other sub-caste of Ahirs in Bihar are Yadav, Raut, Gope, Ray/Rai/Roy, Mandal, Prasad, Thakur, Sinha, Singh, etc.

Notable Persons
Bir Kuar, a god of Krishnaut Ahir.
Karu Khirhar, a folk god.
Bakhtaur Baba, a folk god.
Ranjit Singh Ahir, a rebel of Indian Rebellion of 1857.
Bishu Raut, a folk God of Kosi division and Bhagalpur district of Bihar. 
Badri Ahir, a freedom fighter.
Jiriyawati Devi, a Brave freedom fighter woman who killed 16 english soldier
Narsingh Gope, a freedom revolutionary and Zamindar of Govindpur 
Jiyalal Mandal, a freedom fighter and politician.
Daroga Prasad Rai, Ex-Cm of Bihar.
Ram Lakhan Singh Yadav, a politician.
Ram Jaipal Singh Yadav, Freedom fighter and 3rd  Deputy Chief Minister of Bihar. 
Uday Narayan Rai, a politician.
Hukumdev Narayan Yadav, a politician.
Nand Kishore Yadav, a leader of BJP.
Nityanand Rai, a leader of BJP.
Dinesh Chandra Yadav, currently Member of Parliament from Madhepura and former minister of Bihar Goverment.
Surendra Prasad Yadav, a popular Politician, currently Co- operative minister of Bihar Goverment. 
Dr. Ramanand Yadav, currently Minister in Bihar Government. 
Jitendra Kumar Rai, currently Minister Of Bihar Government

See also
Bihari Ahir
Majhraut
Sadgop
Phatak

References
Vismit chehre

https://books.google.co.in/books?id=mFB_EAAAQBAJ&pg=PA1934&dq=%E0%A4%A8%E0%A4%B0%E0%A4%B8%E0%A4%BF%E0%A4%82%E0%A4%B9+%E0%A4%97%E0%A5%8B%E0%A4%AA&hl=en&newbks=1&newbks_redir=0&source=gb_mobile_search&ovdme=1&sa=X&ved=2ahUKEwjNvpn09Or9AhWGS2wGHeggAREQ6AF6BAgJEAM#v=onepage&q=%E0%A4%A8%E0%A4%B0%E0%A4%B8%E0%A4%BF%E0%A4%82%E0%A4%B9%20%E0%A4%97%E0%A5%8B%E0%A4%AA&f=false

Clans